Yanjing Beer 2016 Chinese FA Cup (Chinese: 燕京啤酒2016中国足球协会杯) was the 18th edition of the Chinese FA Cup and the 60th anniversary of the Chinese National Cup. Guangzhou Evergrande Taobao beat the defending champions Jiangsu Suning on away goals in the final to win their second title.

Schedule

Home Advantage Decision
According to Chinese FA Cup Procedure, In each round, home team advantages are decided as follows.

Qualifying rounds

Group A

Group B

Group C

Group D

First round

Second round

Third round

Fourth round

Fifth round

1st Leg

2nd Leg

Guangzhou Evergrande Taobao won 4–2 on aggregate.

Guangzhou R&F won 5–1 on aggregate.

Shanghai Greenland Shenhua won 5–0 on aggregate.

Jiangsu Suning won 4–3 on aggregate.

Semi-finals

1st Leg

2nd Leg

Guangzhou Evergrande Taobao won 5–3 on aggregate.

Jiangsu Suning won 4–2 on aggregate.

Final

1st Leg

Assistant referees:
 Song Xiangyun
 Zhang Qiangjing
Fourth official:
 Fan Qi

2nd Leg

Assistant referees:
 Lim Kok Heng (Singapore)
 Ronnie Koh Min Kiat (Singapore)
Fourth official:
 Tan Hai

3–3 on aggregate. Guangzhou Evergrande Taobao won on away goals.

Wuhan Hongxing–Jiangsu Suning brawl incident

On 11 May 2016, an on-field brawl occurred in the third-round game of FA Cup between amateur club Wuhan Hongxing and first tier club Jiangsu Suning. Jiangsu's striker Ge Wei scored in the 7th minute of stoppage time as Jiangsu edged Wuhan Hongxing 1–0 and advanced to the next round. Players and staff of Wuhan Hongxing lost control and attacked their counterparts following the final whistle. Jiangsu's Xie Pengfei was hit onto the ground by several Wuhan players, while scorer Ge Wei was injured on his rib; many other Jiangsu's players also suffered injuries in the melee. Some reporters from Jiangsu were also assaulted in the incident. Jiangsu's staff Wu Bo, who was recording the match, was beaten up by a group of unidentified people.

Jiangsu Suning left Wuhan on a high-speed train immediately after the match. The officials of Wuhan Hongxing condemned the brawl and vowed to punish the players involved later that day. They also emphasized that the cause of the brawl could not ascribed to Wuhan only as they believed the goal celebration of Jiangsu was a deliberate provocation. On 12 May 2016, Wuhan Hongxing issued an apology to Jiangsu and announced that five players who were involved the brawl had been sacked by the club. However, Wuhan was exposed to use ineligible players in the match on the same day.

On 20 May 2016, the Chinese Football Association published the survey results and punishments. Jiangsu was awarded a 3–0 win. Wuhan Hongxing Bairun F.C. was fined 200,000 RMB and banned from all future matches organised by the Chinese Football Association. Six players and two staff of Wuhan received a life ban from football, four players of Wuhan received a 36-month ban from football and ten players of Wuhan received a 24-month ban from football.

Awards
 Top Scorer(s):  Obafemi Martins (Shanghai Greenland Shenhua) Eran Zahavi (Guangzhou R&F) Alex Teixeira (Jiangsu Suning) (6 goals)
 Most Valuable Player:  Roger Martínez (Jiangsu Suning)
 Best Coach:  Luiz Felipe Scolari (Guangzhou Evergrande Taobao)
 Fair Play Award: Guangzhou R&F
 Dark Horse Award: Tianjin Quanjian

Top scorers
Source:

Notes

References

2016
2016 in Chinese football
2016 domestic association football cups
Guangzhou F.C. matches
Jiangsu F.C. matches